Bearded Ladies is a radio programme that was originally aired on BBC Radio 4 between 2003 and 2007.  There are currently 22 half-hour episodes; although the last 6, aired in 2007, do have a loose narrative structure holding the individual sketches together, it is essentially a sketch-driven comedy programme.  It stars Oriane Messina, Fay Rusling, Charlotte MacDougall, and Susie Donkin.

References 
Lavalie, John. "Bearded Ladies." EpGuides. 21 Jul 2005. 29 Jul 2005  <https://web.archive.org/web/20070613111551/http://epguides.com/BeardedLadies/%3E.

External links 
Official homepage

Bearded Ladies at bbc.co.uk/programmes

BBC Radio 4 programmes
BBC Radio comedy programmes
2003 radio programme debuts